Geoffrey M. Hall has been Dean of Fredericton since 1 September 2014.

In 1986 he graduated from the University of New Brunswick with a degree in Education (BEd) with a major in Environmental Studies and a minor in General Science. Admitted as Master of Divinity (MDiv - Atlantic School of Theology, Halifax) in 1990, he was ordained deacon that same year and priest in 1991.

He served in parishes of the Diocese of Fredericton: St. Philip's, Moncton, Central Kings, St. Paul (Saint John), the Tobique (Plaster Rock), Grand Bay and Ketepec (1993-2003), Archdeacon of St. Andrews (2001-2003) and Executive Assistant to the Bishop of Fredericton and Diocesan Archdeacon (2003-2014).

Notes

Archdeacons of Fredericton
Deans of Fredericton
Living people
1961 births